Alex (or Alexander) Vincent is the name of:

Alex Vincent (actor) (born 1981), American actor, best known for playing Andy Barclay in the films Child's Play, Child's Play 2, Curse of Chucky and Cult of Chucky 
Alex Vincent (drummer), American drummer
Alex Vincent (actress) in Socks and Cakes
Alexander Vincent (politician), Malaysian politician

See also